Lockney is a town in Floyd County, Texas, United States. The population was 1,842 at the 2010 census, down from 2,056 at the 2000 census.

Geography

Lockney is located in northwestern Floyd County at  (34.122961, –101.443414). U.S. Route 70 passes through the town, leading southeast  to Floydada, the county seat, and northwest  to Plainview.

Demographics

2020 census

As of the 2020 United States census, there were 1,498 people, 554 households, and 379 families residing in the town.

2000 census
As of the census of 2000, there were 2,056 people, 690 households, and 540 families residing in the town. The population density was 1,326.3 people per square mile (512.1/km2). There were 791 housing units at an average density of 510.3 per square mile (197.0/km2). The racial makeup of the town was 72.62% White, 2.53% African American, 0.24% Native American, 0.15% Asian, 0.10% Pacific Islander, 22.81% from other races, and 1.56% from two or more races. Hispanic or Latino of any race were 51.90% of the population.

There were 690 households, out of which 44.1% had children under the age of 18 living with them, 65.2% were married couples living together, 8.4% had a female householder with no husband present, and 21.7% were non-families. 20.6% of all households were made up of individuals, and 12.6% had someone living alone who was 65 years of age or older. The average household size was 2.92 and the average family size was 3.40.

In the town, the population was spread out, with 33.5% under the age of 18, 7.7% from 18 to 24, 24.6% from 25 to 44, 18.5% from 45 to 64, and 15.8% who were 65 years of age or older. The median age was 33 years. For every 100 females, there were 89.1 males. For every 100 females age 18 and over, there were 88.2 males.

The median income for a household in the town was $29,074, and the median income for a family was $35,469. Males had a median income of $25,673 versus $18,063 for females. The per capita income for the town was $13,528. About 14.5% of families and 17.1% of the population were below the poverty line, including 19.8% of those under age 18 and 17.0% of those age 65 or over.

Education
The town is served by the Lockney Independent School District and is home to the Lockney High School Longhorns.

Films

 2002 – Larry v. Lockney. Directed by Mark Birnbaum and Jim Schermbeck.
 2021 – Lockney is one of the filming locations for Destination Marfa

Notable people

 George Eade, 4-Star General, born in Lockney in 1921
 Maurice Ewing, a geophysicist and oceanographer, born in Lockney in 1906
 Marsha Sharp, first gained recognition for her coaching skills while coaching the Lady Longhorns in Lockney, Texas. She coached six years on the high school level at Lockney
 Andy Stapp, reality TV personality on the TV Series  Overhaulin, Car Warriors, and Search and Restore. His car building and custom paint has been featured on Speed Channel, Velocity Channel, Spike Channel, and Discovery Channel. Andy is also the writer and director of the award winning film titled DESTINATION MARFA
 Garry Templeton, Major League Baseball player, born in Lockney in 1956
 Arland Thompson, born in Lockney Texas September 19, 1957, Thompson is a former NFL player who turned scientist after his retirement
 Damon Washington, NFL running back, born in Lockney in 1977
 Louie Welch, mayor of Houston from 1964 to 1973, born in Lockney in 1918
 Lucy Dean Record is a nationally recognized professional musician

Climate
According to the Köppen Climate Classification system, Lockney has a semi-arid climate, abbreviated "BSk" on climate maps.

See also
South Plains Wind Farm

References

External links

Photos of the Llano Estacado

Towns in Floyd County, Texas
Towns in Texas